Ageratina havanensis, the Havana snakeroot or white mistflower, is a species of flowering shrub in the family Asteraceae, native to the south-western United States (Texas), Cuba, and north-eastern and east-central Mexico (Veracruz, Tamaulipas, Coahuila, Nuevo León, Hidalgo, San Luis Potosí, Puebla, Guanajuato, Querétaro). Unlike many other species of Ageratina, it is evergreen.

Etymology
Ageratina is derived from Greek meaning 'un-aging', in reference to the flowers keeping their color for a long time. This name was used by Dioscorides for a number of different plants.

References

havanensis
Flora of Cuba
Flora of Mexico
Flora of Texas
Plants described in 1820